"Aventura" (English: "Adventure") is a song by Puerto Rican musicians Lunay, Ozuna and Anuel AA. The song was released on October 25, 2019, as the fifth single from Lunay's debut album Épico. The song debuted number one on the Billboard Latin Airplay chart.

Charts

Weekly charts

Year-end charts

Certifications

See also 
 List of Billboard Hot Latin Songs and Latin Airplay number ones of 2019

References 

2019 singles
2019 songs
Ozuna (singer) songs
Anuel AA songs
Spanish-language songs
Songs written by Chris Jedi